The 1874 Missouri gubernatorial election was held on November 3, 1874 and resulted in a victory for the Democratic nominee, Charles Henry Hardin, over the Republican candidate, William Gentry.

Results

References

Missouri
1874
Gubernatorial
November 1874 events